Télesphore Simard may refer to:

 Télesphore Simard (MNA) (1863–1924), member of Legislative Assembly of Quebec in Témiscamingue riding
 Télesphore Simard (mayor) (1878–1955), mayor of Quebec City